"Endless Summer" is a song by German group Scooter, released in July 1995 as the fourth and final single from their debut album, ... and the Beat Goes On! (1995). Its accompanying music video was directed by Eric Will.

Track listings

Charts

Weekly charts

 *: In the UK, this song was part of the Move Your Ass EP.

Year-end charts

Certifications

References

1995 singles
1995 songs
Music videos directed by Eric Will
Scooter (band) songs
Songs written by Jens Thele
Songs written by H.P. Baxxter
Songs written by Rick J. Jordan